Eastern Bay of Plenty is a former New Zealand parliamentary electorate, which existed for one parliamentary term from 1993 to 1996, and was held by National's Tony Ryall.

Population centres
Based on the 1991 New Zealand census, an electoral redistribution was carried out. This resulted in the abolition of nine electorates, and the creation of eleven new electorates. Through an amendment in the Electoral Act in 1965, the number of electorates in the South Island was fixed at 25, so the new electorates increased the number of the North Island electorates by two. In the South Island, one electorate was abolished and one electorate was recreated. In the North Island, five electorates were newly created (including Eastern Bay of Plenty), five electorates were recreated, and eight electorates were abolished.

The electorate included all the Ōpōtiki and Kawerau Districts, most of the Whakatane District, and a small part of the Gisborne District. The main towns were Whakatāne and Ōpōtiki, and in addition, polling booths were at Awakeri, Cape Runaway, Galatea, Kawerau, Kutarere, Matawai, Minginui, Motu, Murupara, Nukuhou, Ōhope, Omaio, Omarumutu, Otoko, Paroa, Raukokore, Ruatoki, Tāneatua, Te Kaha, Te Teko, Thornton, Tōrere, Waimana, Waioeka, Waiohau, and Woodlands.

History
Tony Ryall of the National Party was the electorate's representative during its existence from 1993 to 1996.

Members of Parliament
Key

Election results

1993 election

References

 

Historical electorates of New Zealand
Bay of Plenty Region
1993 establishments in New Zealand
1996 disestablishments in New Zealand